The 2021–22 Virginia Tech Hokies women's basketball team represented Virginia Polytechnic Institute and State University during the 2021–22 NCAA Division I women's basketball season. The Hokies, were led by sixth year head coach Kenny Brooks, and played their home games at Cassell Coliseum as members of the Atlantic Coast Conference.

The Hokies finished the season 23–10 overall and 13–5 in ACC play to finish in a three way tie for third place.  As the fifth seed in the ACC tournament, they defeated thirteenth seed Clemson in the Second Round and fourth seed North Carolina in the Quarterfinals before losing to eventual champions and first seed NC State in the Semifinals.  They received an at-large bid to the NCAA tournament where they were the fifth seed in the Spokane Region.  They lost to twelfth seed Florida Gulf Coast in the First Round to end their season.

Previous season

The Hokies finished the season 15–10 and 8–8 in ACC play to finish in seventh place. In the ACC tournament, they defeated to Miami in the Second Round before losing to eventual champions NC State in the Quarterfinals.  They received an at-large bid to the NCAA tournament where they were the seven seed in the Riverwalk Regional.  In the tournament they defeated ten seed  in the First Round before losing to two seed Baylor in the Second Round to end their season.

Off-season

Departures

Incoming transfers

Roster

Schedule

Source:

|-
!colspan=6 style=| Non-conference regular season

|-
!colspan=6 style=| ACC regular season

|-
!colspan=6 style=| ACC Women's Tournament

|-
!colspan=6 style=";"| NCAA tournament

Rankings

Coaches did not release a Week 2 poll and AP does not release a poll after the NCAA Tournament.

See also
 2021–22 Virginia Tech Hokies men's basketball team

References

Virginia Tech
Virginia Tech
Virginia Tech
Virginia Tech Hokies women's basketball seasons
Virginia Tech